Du Maurier is a Canadian brand of cigarette, produced by Imperial Tobacco Canada, a subsidiary of conglomerate British American Tobacco. The brand is named after Sir Gerald du Maurier, the noted British actor. The brand is also produced under license by the West Indian Tobacco Company in Trinidad and Tobago.

History

The brand launched in the United Kingdom in 1930 after the actor and producer Sir Gerald du Maurier (father of writer Daphne du Maurier) made requests for "a cigarette less irritating to his throat". He lent his name to the creation of a cigarette brand, the royalties for which he used to pay down his substantial tax liabilities. The tobacco company which launched the brand, Peter Jackson, was a subsidiary of International Tobacco, which was taken over by Gallaher in 1934.

In 1979, the brand passed to British American Tobacco, which had owned the trade mark overseas since they acquired Peter Jackson (Overseas) Ltd. in 1955. The brand became the best-selling cigarette brand in Canada with a market share of 40%, and was also sold in various other countries.

In 2005, Du Maurier changed the aesthetic of their packs and cigarette vending machines to compete with the introduction of new text and picture warnings, which covered 50% of the packs. It is presumed this was done to keep up with the rapidly changing cigarette market, which saw the introduction of new, cheaper brands as well as an increase in taxes and to give the brand a "new and fresh look".

Various advertising posters were made for this brand, promoting the filter which would make for an "improved flavour and a cool and satisfying smoke... with no bits in the mouth".

The brand is mainly sold in Canada, but also was or still is sold in the United Kingdom, Luxembourg, Malta, Libya, South Africa, United States, Trinidad and Tobago, Grenada, Guyana, Brazil, South Vietnam, Japan, Australia and New Zealand.

Sport sponsorship 
Du Maurier was the sponsor of the Canadian Women's Open golf from 1988 until 2000, as well as the Canadian Open's women tennis from 1997 until 2000, when new anti-tobacco legislation came into force in Canada and prohibited tobacco companies from sponsoring major sport events.

Product
Du Maurier markets the following varieties of cigarettes:

 Signature (Red)
 Distinct (Blue)
 Distinct Silver (Silver)
 Mellow (Beige)
 Menthol (Green) (Discontinued in Canada)
 Fine Cut Blend
 Master Blend
 Fresh Blend (Discontinued in Canada)
 Special Blend

See also

 Tobacco smoking
 Caballero (cigarette)

References

External links

 

1930 establishments in Canada
Canadian brands
British American Tobacco brands